Wasabi is a 2001 French action-comedy film directed by Gérard Krawczyk and written and produced by Luc Besson. The film stars Jean Reno, Michel Muller and Ryōko Hirosue. In France, it was released as Wasabi, la petite moutarde qui monte au nez ("Wasabi, the little mustard that gets right up your nose").

The film gets its title from a scene where the protagonist, Hubert Fiorentini (Reno), eats a whole serving of wasabi at a Japanese restaurant without flinching.

Plot
A woman (later revealed to be a transvestite), dancing provocatively to the enjoyment of other nightclub patrons, is abruptly hit in the face by Hubert Florentini (Reno), a commisaire of the French Police. Florentini drags her out of the club in handcuffs, assaulting other patrons who come too close to free the captive woman or attempt to hinder his exit. Unfortunately, one of these patrons includes the chief's son.

Florentini is chastised for the violent and unorthodox methods that he uses to accomplish his goals and is put on paid leave from the force. Despite his success and his seemingly enjoyable lifestyle of fighting crime, playing golf, and being the object of a beautiful woman's (Bouquet's) attentions, he has been unable to forget his one true love, Miko, a Japanese spy he met 19 years prior. Upon receiving news of her death, he is summoned to Japan by her lawyer, Ishibashi (Haruhiko Hirata) for the reading of her will.

Ishibashi informs Florentini that he has inherited the guardianship of Yumi (Hirosue), a fiery, adorable and eccentric Japanese/French teenage girl over whom he has custody until she reaches adulthood in two days (the age of adulthood in Japan being 20). Yumi, who was led to believe she was the result of her mother's rape and subsequent abandonment, hates her unknown father. Florentini realizes Yumi is his daughter, but does not tell her as she would probably flee from him.

Florentini uncovers evidence that Miko was the victim of foul play.  He discovers that Miko had stolen a small fortune from the Yakuza, a fortune now destined for Yumi upon reaching adulthood. Florentini summons the help of Momo (Michel Muller), a former intelligence colleague living in Tokyo. He helps Florentini with further investigations into Miko's death and in guarding Yumi from the Yakuza by supplying him with two metal suitcases of weapons. The Yakuza try to attack Yumi in an arcade, but Florentini, who has been observing their positions, kills all of them.

Later, Yumi discovers that Florentini is her father as she is captured by the Yakuza. As they take her away and prepare to execute Florentini, he uses golf balls to knock out his would-be executioners and knock out the rest in mêlée combat. With the help of former intelligence colleagues, Florentini and Momo free Yumi from her kidnappers when they attempt to withdraw money from Yumi's bank account by replacing the bank's staff and customers with their own men. During the rescue attempt a gunfight breaks out and all of the Yakuza are killed by Florentini single-handedly without any casualties to the good guys.

Following the ordeal, Florentini takes a flight back to France, having promised Yumi he would be back in a month. But just before the plane takes off, a group of customs officers enter the cabin with two familiar metal suitcases in hand, asking for their owner.

Cast
 Jean Reno as Hubert Fiorentini
 Ryōko Hirosue as Yumi Yoshimido (Nihongo: 吉堂由美, Yoshi dō Yumi)
 Michel Muller as Maurice "Momo"
 Carole Bouquet as Sofia
 Ludovic Berthillot as Jean-Baptiste #1
 Yan Epstein as Jean-Baptiste #2
 Michel Scourneau as Van Eyck
 Christian Sinniger as Squale
 Jean-Marc Montalto as Olivier
 Alexandre Brik as Irène
 Fabio Zenoni as Josy
 Véronique Balme as Betty
 Jacques Bondoux as Del Rio
  as Takanawa (Nihongo: 高輪, Takanawa)
  as Ishibashi (Nihongo: 石橋, Ishibashi)
 Edilberto Ruiz as Guacamole

Production
The film was shot in Tokyo, Japan.

Reception
Wasabi was met with mixed reviews, with a 43% approval rating on Rotten Tomatoes. Roger Ebert gave the film one-and-a-half out of four stars, commenting that "Reno does what he can in a thankless situation, the film ricochets from humor to violence and back again, and Ryoko Hirosue makes us wonder if she is always like that." On Metacritic, the film holds a score of 53 out of 100, based on reviews from 15 critics, indicating "mixed or average reviews".

Despite some exhibitor expectations, it only opened in second place at the French box office, behind American Pie 2, with a gross of 18.6 million Francs ($2.7 million) for the week. It reached number one in its second week with a gross of 9.4 million Francs. It grossed $6.7 million in France and $10.4 million worldwide.

References

External links
 
 
 
 

2001 films
2000s action comedy films
EuropaCorp films
2000s French-language films
2000s Japanese-language films
French action comedy films
Films directed by Gérard Krawczyk
Films scored by Éric Serra
Films set in Paris
Films set in Tokyo
Films shot in Paris
Films shot in Tokyo
Yakuza films
Films produced by Luc Besson
2001 comedy films
Japan in non-Japanese culture
2000s French films